Growth factor receptor-bound protein 14 is a protein that in humans is encoded by the GRB14 gene.

The product of this gene belongs to a small family of adapter proteins that are known to interact with a number of receptor tyrosine kinases and signaling molecules. This gene encodes a growth factor receptor-binding protein that interacts with insulin receptors and insulin-like growth-factor receptors. This protein likely has an inhibitory effect on receptor tyrosine kinase signaling and, in particular, on insulin receptor signaling. This gene may play a role in signaling pathways that regulate growth and metabolism. Transcript variants have been reported for this gene, but their full-length natures have not been determined to date.

Interactions
GRB14 has been shown to interact with Epidermal growth factor receptor, Fibroblast growth factor receptor 1 and TNKS2.

References

Further reading